Manathoor is a small village in Kottayam district, aside Pala - Thodupuzha Highway, 12 km from Palai town and 15 km from Thodupuzha town.

It lies aside of Main Eastern Highway (SH-8). It lies In eastern part of Kottayam District and shares its north-eastern border with Idukki District.

It is also known as Pizhaku.

Demography and Religion
Around 750 families are living here. 
The majority of the people here are Christians and Hindus. All Religions and Culture live in religious harmony.

The Christian community belongs to St. Thomas Christians (Marthoma Nazrani) or Catholic Syrian Christians (RCSC). St. Mary's Church Manathoor, Pizhaku  is the only church in this village. They follows Syro - Malabar Rite in Qurbana. It is under the Eparchy of Palai. Many ancient families are found here. The community has a Shrine dedicated to Saint Joseph near Manathoor School Junction. During the period of lent The Way of the Cross Procession takes place to the Kurishu Mala in Manathoor - Karimkunnam Road. The birthday of Mother Mary, 7 and 8 September is celebrated as feast days of the Church. The parish has almost 410 families.

The Pizhaku Thrikkayil Sri Krishna Swami temple is very ancient. There was also a  Palace associated with the temple. (Pizhakum Kottaram). This is near to Manathoor School junction. SNDP temple was newly constructed and dedicated to Sri Narayana Guru. During Sri Krishna Jayanthi Procession is held. Sapthaha Yajnam is conducted in Month of Nov - Jan. Utsavam falls in the month of January.

Name 
The true name of Manathoor village is Pizhaku. The parish name caused this area to be known as Manathoor in the 1900s. In all records related to land and surveys, the place name is purely Pizhaku (Pizhakum Kara). The location of post office of Pizhaku at Ramapuram Kavala made boosting for the name Manathoor more popular when Ramapuram Kavala came to be known as Pizhaku Junction.

The meaning of Manathoor can be split into two words Maanath (meaning: Sky) and Ooru (meaning: Place).

Festivals 
Onam and Christmas are the major festivals celebrated in this village. Vishu and Easter is also Celebrated with crackers and special food.

Crib is made in almost all Christian homes and a Star is hung. Christmas Carols are conducted by the church to all the homes.

During Onam, Athappokkalam is made and Jaihind Club conducts competitions. The temple, church, clubs and school celebrates onam in a good way. The day of national importance such as Independence day, Republic Day is celebrated.

During 7 and 8 September the Church Feast is Celebrated in a tremendous manner,

During the month of January Utsavam of the temple is conducted.

Geography
This village is almost between Palai and Thodupuzha and post office is Pizhaku at Ramapuram Kavala. The neighbouring villages are Kurinji, Karimkunnam, Nellappara in North, Mattathippara, Kavumkandom in east, Ramapuram in west. The nearest railway station is kottayam. Nearest airport is Cochin.

Manathoor has low-lying areas as well as Mountains. The Pala - Thodupuzha Highway passes through the heart of Manathoor. The road lies in a valley, where both sides are elevated.

There are two main junctions in Manathoor: Church junction and school junction. 
The main spots in this village are Pampanal waterfall, St.Mary's Church, St.Joseph's High School, and Sri Krishna Temple.

Climate & Agriculture
Manathoor has a pleasant climate. Its neither too hot nor cold. June - November is the rainy season. The temperature varies from 20 degree Celsius to 36 degree Celsius which is almost constant throughout the year. The mornings of December - January gives an amazing foggy experience with sunlight beams piercing it. During the start of monsoon rain, Pampanal waterfall will give an amazing view for those who love the art of nature. The place has mist-covered mountains and valleys.

Its peculiar and unique geographical position is well-matched for the cultivation of rubber, pepper, coconut and vanilla. Majority families have Rubber Plantations. There are some paddy fields as well. Major cultivation here is rubber and coconut.

Pampanal Waterfalls 
Pampanal Waterfalls is a famous waterfall in Kottayam district, Kerala. Pampanal Falls is located 43 km away from Kottayam & 17 km away from Thodupuzha. During the monsoon season, it gives an amazing view. May - December is the good time to watch this nature's beauty.

Location

Pampanal Falls is situated in Manathoor - Karimkunnam Shortcut Road, a diversion of Pala - Thodupuzha road from Manathoor.

One have to travel 2 km through Manathoor-Karimkunnam Shoortcut road (Opposite of St. Joseph's High School. Manathoor at Pala - Thodupuzha Road). From Manathoor-Karimkunnam Shortcut Road a deviation has to be taken for 500 metres to reach the falls.

Royal Enfield Trivandrum conducted their 49th official ride to Pampanal Waterfalls on 30 October 2016.

Attractions at Pampanal Falls

Three Waterfalls are there in Pampanal. Trekking from Waterfalls in Top to one in Bottom is a major attraction. Tourist can not only take bath but also take snaps closer in this falls. The falls comes from Mattathipara hills.

Pampanal Falls - Travel Tips

Falls can be accessed only by 1 km foot walk from Manathoor - Karimkunnam Shortcut Road

Best time to visit is soon after monsoon

Bathing is permitted.

How to Reach Pampanal Falls

By Air: Cochin International Airport is the nearest airport to Pampanal Falls

By Rail: Kottayam Railway Station is the major railway station closer to Pampanal Falls

By Bus: Frequent buses are available in Thodupuzha - Pala Route. Take Manathoor ticket. From Manathoor hire Autoriksha (approx. 40 rs)

By Road: You can come in your private vehicle less than one km away to Pampanal Falls. (Kottayam -> Pala -> Manathoor -> Pampanal Fals or Thodupuzha -> Karimkunnam -> Pampanal Falls)

Facilities and Development 
Compared to other villages in Kerala, Manathoor is well developed with all basic amenities. Several are described below.

IT Companies 
The first IT company from Manathoor is I-MAKE IT and Media Solutions,  Established in 2014, Starting as a small firm now the company is serving as back end office and technical support team for many MNC companies and individuals. They are concentrated in Web technologies like php, codeigniter, mysql etc.

Post Office 
The post office of Manathoor is Pizhaku is also located at Ramapuram Kavala Junction with Speed Post Facility. Pincode: 686651

Bank 
Co-Operative Bank (Kadanad Service Co-operative Bank)
In 1979, KSCB (The Kadanad Service Co-operative Bank Ltd. K2) opened its first branch in Manathoor Church Junction, Pizhaku.

SBI at Ramapuram Kavala, Pizhaku is near to Manathoor.

Schools 
St. Joseph's School (Kerala State Syllabus) at Manathoor, Pizhaku satisfies the educational needs of this area. Nirmala Public School is available within 1 km radius

Accessibility and Transportation 
Majority of Roads at Manathoor is well paved and in Good Condition. The SH 8, Pala-Thodupuzha Highway Passes through the centre of this place. All the 2 main junctions at Manathoor are accessible through this highway. i.e. Manathoor School Jn., Manathoor Church Jn. Manathoor-Karimkunnam Shortcut Road,  Manathoor-Cherukurinji Road, Manathoor-Pattam:  These are the other important roads at Manathoor.

Manathoor is blessed with plenty buses services. Plenty of Private buses plying between Pala and Thodupuzha are found within an interval of 10 minutes. Moreover, Thodupuzha-Pala-Kottayam Chain KSRTC buses are available with an interval of 15 minutes. Long trip buses are also available to major destinations in South Kerala and Malabar. Thodupuzha - Thiruvananthapuram buses are available through this route. To northern side Nilambur, Mananthavady, Sulthan Bathery, Kozhikode, Thiruvambady, Kasargod, Kannur, Palakkad Thrissur, Aluva-Mala, Wayanad, Idukki, Adimali buses are available. Interstate services such as Bangalore and Coimbatore are also available. The major bus stops are: Manathoor School Junction (LS FP) Manathoor Church Junction.

By Rail: Kottayam is the nearest railway station (45 km) . Ernakulam is also close. (65 km) By Air: Cochin International Airport - 70 km

Medical and Health Care 
A Homeo Clinic is available  - Near Manathoor Church. Few Doctors Practice privately at Manathoor-Pizhaku.

Communication & Others 
Almost all houses have Landphone connection. This area has good service for BSNL, Idea, Vodafone and Jio. BSNL and Cable TV provides Internet connection. Almost all houses have an electricity connection from KSEB. Many local shops - grocery, stationery, butcher, bakery, studio are available. JaiHind Library is the main public Library at Pizhaku-Manathoor. Volley Ball Courts and Badminton Courts are available at Manathoor.

Gallery

References

Villages in Kottayam district